Kamyaran County is in Kurdistan province, Iran. The capital of the county is the city of Kamyaran. At the 2006 census, the county's population was 104,704 in 25,012 households. The following census in 2011 counted 105,996 people in 28,508 households. At the 2016 census, the county's population was 102,856 in 30,276 households.

Administrative divisions

The population history of Kamyaran County's administrative divisions over three consecutive censuses is shown in the following table. The latest census shows two districts, seven rural districts, and two cities.

References

 

Counties of Kurdistan Province